MW Propellers, was an American manufacturer of wooden propellers for homebuilt and ultralight aircraft. The company headquarters was located in Tucson, Arizona.

See also
List of aircraft propeller manufacturers

References 

Aircraft propeller manufacturers
Aircraft component manufacturers of the United States
Companies with year of disestablishment missing
Companies with year of establishment missing
Companies based in Tucson, Arizona
Defunct manufacturing companies based in Arizona